Donegal ("fort of the foreigners")  is a town in County Donegal, Ireland. The name was also historically spelt 'Dunnagall'. Although Donegal gave its name to the county, now Lifford is the county town. From the 15th until the early 17th century, Donegal was the 'capital' of Tyrconnell, a Gaelic kingdom controlled by the O'Donnell dynasty of the Northern Uí Néill.

Donegal is in South Donegal and is located at the mouth of the River Eske and Donegal Bay, which is overshadowed by the Blue Stack Mountains ('the Croaghs'). The Drumenny Burn, which flows along the eastern edge of Donegal Town, flows into the River Eske on the north-eastern edge of the town, between the Community Hospital and The Northern Garage. The Ballybofey Road (the R267) crosses the Drumenny Burn near where it flows into the River Eske. The town is bypassed by the N15 and N56 roads. The centre of the town, known as The Diamond, is a hub for music, poetic and cultural gatherings in the area.

History

There is archaeological evidence for settlements around the town dating to prehistoric times, including the remains of ringforts and other defensive earthworks.

Saint Patrick was captured by raiders from the clans governed by Niall of the Nine Hostages, and this region is that to which Patrick returned, being familiar with the people, language, customs and lands. The first clan to convert to Christianity as the result of St Patrick's efforts was Cenel Chonaill, the principal branch of which are the O'Donnells also known at one time as Clan Dálaigh. Connall was a son of Niall of the Nine Hostages. As a result of their acceptance of Christianity, Patrick blessed the clan members; the sign of the cross appeared on the chieftain's shield and this became not only the heraldic device for the clan but also for County Donegal.

Donegal Town itself is famous for being the former centre of government of the O'Donnell dynasty, the great Gaelic royal family who ruled Tír Chonaill in west Ulster for centuries and who played a pivotal role in Irish history. Their original homeland lay further to the north in the area of Kilmacrennan. From the 15th to the 17th century, they were an important part of the opposition to the colonisation of Ireland by England. The town itself contains Donegal Castle, on the banks of the River Eske, and the remains of Donegal Abbey, a Franciscan abbey which dates back to the 15th century on the Southern shore of the Bay. The Annals of the Four Masters may have been partially written in the old abbey in the 1630s. The story of Hugh Roe O'Donnell (also known as "Red" Hugh II), Lord of Tyrconnell, was the inspiration behind many books and films, not least, Disney's The Fighting Prince of Donegal.

In 1601 the Siege of Donegal took place during the Nine Years' War. After the Flight of the Earls from near Rathmullan in September 1607, the castle and its lands were seized by the English Crown and given to an Englishman, Captain Basil Brooke, as part of the Plantation of Ulster. Captain (later Sir) Basil Brooke (ancestor of the Viscounts Brookeborough) was granted the castle around 1611 and he proceeded to carry out major reconstruction work and added a wing to the castle in the Jacobean style. The current plan of the town was also laid out by Brooke, including an attractive town square known as The Diamond. From the late 17th until the early 20th centuries, Donegal Town formed part of the vast estates of the Gore family (from 1762 Earls of Arran in the Peerage of Ireland) and it was during their ownership that the town took on its present appearance. Donegal Borough returned two members to the Irish House of Commons, the lower house of the Parliament of Ireland, until the Acts of Union 1800 came into force in January 1801. Evidence of the Great Famine still exists, including a workhouse, whose buildings are now part of the local hospital, and many famine graves.

Buildings of note

Donegal Castle
Donegal Castle was the stronghold of the O'Donnells. It has been restored by the Office of Public Works.

St. Patrick's Church of the Four Masters
Dedicated to Saint Patrick and 'the Four Masters', this Catholic church was built in the early 1930s and was completed in 1935. Known locally as 'the Chapel' or 'the Town Chapel', it was designed by Ralph Byrne, the famous Dublin architect, in a mixed neo-Irish Romanesque and neo-Gothic style.

Donegal Parish Church
This Church of Ireland church was built in a simple Gothic style mainly in the late 1820s and was completed in 1828. The main church appears to have been designed by a Mr Graham of Donegal Town. A chancel was added in 1890.<ref>Alistair Rowan, The Buildings of Ireland: North West Ulster (popularly known as the Pevsner Guide to North West Ulster), p. 238. Yale, London, 2003 (originally published by Penguin, London, 1979).</ref> The chancel of 1890 was designed by the office of J. Guy Ferguson in Derry and built in a neo-Gothic style by James McClean builders from Strabane.

Industry and tourism

There are many sandy beaches in the area of Donegal, such as Murvagh beach, and some boasting good surfing conditions, such as Rossnowlagh. Donegal is also used as a base for hill-walking in the nearby Blue Stack Mountains. The town has many hotels catering for visitors, and nearby towns such as Letterkenny offer public swimming pools, cinemas and large shopping centres.

Like most clothing manufacturers in Ireland, the size of the workforce has been in decline for many years. Some of the clothing manufacturers have survived by focusing on one particular item of clothing. For example, tailor David Hanna, who started making suits for the locals in 1924, switched to making only hats in 1964 and is now shipping them all over the world.Wild Atlantic Way, National Geographic Traveller, August 30, 2017, p.15 Donegal also has a long tradition of weaving carpets. Donegal Carpets have been made in Killybegs for over one hundred years and have been found in Áras an Uachtaráin, the University of Notre Dame and the White House.

On 1 December 2016, National Geographic Traveller named Donegal as the number 1 coolest destination of 2017.  According to Pat Riddell, editor of the UK magazine, "It's a warm-hearted place, but wilderness always feels just a stone's throw away. And it is wilderness . . . world-class wilderness. We think it's due a big year."

Transport

The Bus Éireann service number 64 Derry/Galway route: this makes several other stops including Letterkenny and Sligo (which allows for rail connections by Iarnród Éireann, from Sligo Mac Diarmada railway station in Sligo to Dublin Connolly railway station. This route also allows for rail connections from Waterside Railway Station in Derry to Belfast, via Coleraine. The number 30 Donegal Town/Dublin route which makes stops at other key towns such as Enniskillen (which provides connections to Belfast via Ulsterbus). Two private companies operate the other routes: 'McGeehan Bus' operates a regular service, from Glencolmcille and Dungloe in West Donegal to Dublin Airport and Busáras in Dublin, which passes through the town; while Feda O'Donnell Coaches (also known as Bus Feda) operates a regular Glenties/Galway service that stops in Donegal.

Donegal railway station opened on 16 September 1889 and finally closed on 1 January 1960. The site of the old station is now used by CIÉ as a bus depot while the actual building is the home of the Donegal Railway Centre.

Sport
Donegal town is home to many amateur sports clubs. The most popular sport in the area is Gaelic football and the local GAA club is Four Masters. The club also has been developing hurling. Other popular sports include association football, rugby union, basketball and track and field.

Donegal Town was host to the final stage of the World Rally Championship on 1 February 2009 and was viewed by 68 million people worldwide.

Media
The town is home to the regional newspapers Donegal Democrat and Donegal Post and the local Donegal Times newspaper. The Northwest Express regional newspaper is also distributed throughout the town and surrounding county, as is The Derry Journal. Ocean FM, an independent local radio station from Collooney in County Sligo, has one of its three studios in the town, which broadcasts to most of south County Donegal. Highland Radio, which is based in Letterkenny, can also be received in the town.

Notable people
Donnell Óg O'Donnell (c. 1242-1281), The O'Donnell, crowned King of Tyrconnell in Raphoe Cathedral in 1258 
Hugh Roe O'Donnell, the 1st, The O'Donnell, King of Tyrconnell, builder of Donegal Castle, (d.1505) 
Sir Hugh Duff O'Donnell, The O'Donnell, King of Tyrconnell (d.1537)
Manus O'Donnell (1490–1564), The O'Donnell, King of Tyrconnell, biographer of Saint Colmcille or Columba
Sir Hugh O'Donnell, The O'Donnell, King of Tyrconnell (d. 1601) 
Hugh Roe Ó Donnell (1572–1601), The O'Donnell, 24th Chieftain, Prince and Lord of Tyrconnell
Rory O'Donnell, 1st Earl of Tyrconnell (1575–1608), The O'Donnell, Prince and Lord of Tyrconnell
Hugh O'Donnell, 2nd Earl of Tyrconnell (1606–1642), Prince and Lord of Tyrconnell
Mary Stuart O'Donnell (1607-c. 1639), Irish noblewoman, renowned for her flight from England to Flanders, daughter of Rory, The O'Donnell, Prince and Lord of Tyrconnell
Patrick O'Donnell (cardinal) (1856-1927) of Glenties, Irish nationalist, Bishop of Raphoe, Archbishop of Armagh, and Cardinal
 Karl Lacey (born 1984) - Gaelic footballer and 2012 All Stars Footballer of the Year
 Colonel Robertson, soldier and philanthropist
 John White (1833-1894), Conservative MP in the House of Commons of Canada

Climate
Climate in this area has mild differences between highs and lows, and there is adequate rainfall year-round.  The Köppen climate classification subtype for this climate is "Cfb" (Marine West Coast Climate/Oceanic climate).

See also
 List of towns and villages in the Republic of Ireland
 Abbey Vocational School
 List of monastic houses in Ireland#County Donegal

References

Further reading
 Aldwell, B. (2003). "A survey of local resident butterflies in County Donegal". Bull. Ir. biogeog.'' Soc. No. 27. 202–226.
O'Donnell, Francis Martin. The O'Donnells of Tyrconnell – A Hidden Legacy, published by Academica Press LLC, Washington DC, 2019. ; The O’Donnells of Tyrconnell – A Hidden Legacy (Maunsel Irish Research Series) | Academica Press

External links

 

 
Towns and villages in County Donegal